Our Lord's Vineyard (French: Les Vignes du Seigneur) is a 1932 French comedy film directed by René Hervil and starring Victor Boucher and Simone Cerdan. It was based on a play of the same title by Francis de Croisset and Robert de Flers. The film was remade in 1958, starring Fernandel.

Cast
 Victor Boucher as Henri Levrier  
 Simone Cerdan as Gisèle  
 Victor Garland as Jack  
 Jacqueline Made as Yvonne  
 Maximilienne as Tante Aline  
 Mady Berry as Mme. Bourjeon  
 Jean Dax as Hubert Martin 
 Léon Malavier as Jean

References

Bibliography 
 Crisp, Colin. Genre, Myth and Convention in the French Cinema, 1929-1939. Indiana University Press, 2002.

External links 
 

1932 films
1932 comedy films
French comedy films
1930s French-language films
Films directed by René Hervil
French films based on plays
Films based on works by Francis de Croisset
French black-and-white films
1930s French films